Pandan, officially the Municipality of Pandan (Aklanon: Banwa it Pandan), is a 4th class municipality in the province of Antique, Philippines. According to the 2020 census, it has a population of 35,965 people. Making it 7th most populous municipality in the province of Antique.

Pandan is also one of the Antique's industrialized towns and a major tourist destination for its cold spring, the Bugang River and white beaches along the Pandan Bay from Barangay Mag-aba to Barangay Duyong.

History
The town was formally established in 1752 by the Spanish Parishes in the province during the Philippines' colonization by Spain, which started in 1521 and ended with the Spanish–American War in 1899. During World War II, 1942 Japanese occupation of Panay Island saw the harassments and pandemonium in the area. The town was liberated in 1944 as part of the combined Allied forces campaign for the liberation of the Panay Island. In 1945, it was incorporated as a town under the fourth Philippine Republic.

Geography

According to the Philippine Statistics Authority, the municipality has a land area of  constituting  of the  total area of Antique.

Pandan is bounded by Cuyo East Pass as part of Sulu Sea on the west; by
Libertad on the north and northwest; by Aklan province on the east and northeast; and Sebaste on the south.

Pandan Bay has coral and artificial reefs, found in barangays Patria, Tingib, Mag-aba, Botbot and Idiacacan.

Climate

Barangays
Pandan is politically subdivided into 34 barangays, of which 15 lie along the coast, 12 are inland, and 7 are upland.

Sitios

 Bautista (Nauring)
 Calabanog (Idiacacan)
 Danao (Patria)
 Dumili (Centro Sur)
 Inigman (Patria)
 Landingan (Jinalinan)
 Listoga Laguinbanua (Santa Fe)
 Malumpati (Guia)
 Pocatod (Bagumbayan)
 Tabay (Patria)
 Tuburan (Guia)
 Tuburan (Santo Rosario )

Demographics

The population of Pandan in 1903 until 1948 includes that of its former barangays in northern and southern parts (currently municipalities of Libertad and Sebaste, respectively). 
In the 2020 census, Pandan had a population of 35,965.

Language
The language generally spoken in the province of Antique is called Kinaray-a. The Pandananons use a version of Kinaray-a that is more similar to Aklanon. Thus, for example, the English word "No" is "Wara" in Kinaray-a but "Uwa" or "Wa" in Pandananon. Pandananons also use Hiligaynon as their secondary language.

Economy

Pandan is a cross-road municipality in Northern Antique, making it a better area for trade and commerce. Pandananons rely on agriculture and fishing which accounts for almost 75% of the total labor force. The other percentages were made up by professionals, civil servants, workers and Overseas Filipino Workers.
The municipality began experiencing growth in tourism and development in infrastructure and commerce in late 2010. Some of the major projects that was completed in Pandan are the Pandan Public Terminal (which is bigger than that of Passi City's), the Pandan Arboretum project (first in Antique) near the Malumpati Spring Resort and other infrastructure projects in the barangays. The game changer is the Talisay-Perfecta-Santa Ana Road (to be constructed) that will connect the hinterland barangays of Pandan to the town centre. This will lessen the travel time and delivery of goods from the far-flung areas to the town. The current administration is working for more improvements in the growing tourism and commercial sectors.

Tourism

Pandan is becoming one of the top tourist destinations in the country. Both local and foreign tourists bound originally for Boracay have increasingly added a stop in Pandan before or after visiting Boracay.

The town's major attractions include the Malumpati Cold Spring Resort and other popular beach resorts and the Bugang River, which has been nationally awarded several times as "the cleanest inland body of water" in the Philippines; the Pandan Bay sunset, and white-sand beaches, sandwiched between the Sulu Sea to the west and, in the east, the Central Panay Mountain Range, and rice, coconut and other farms.

 Leocadio Alonsagay Dioso Memorial Public Library – Since 2004 Pandan has been home to a library that, according to the National Library of the Philippines, is among the top libraries of its kind in the country. The Dioso Library was built by retired United Nations official Leocadio F. Dioso, Jr. as an ongoing gift to the people and town of Pandan. It is named in honor of the founder's father, Leocadio A. Dioso, whose long career included service as Justice of the Peace, Presidential legal adviser, and Philippine diplomat. Although privately owned and operated, the Library functions officially as the Municipal Library and Information Center of Pandan. Housed in a two-story building on 1,700 sq. meters of land in the town center, a block away from the Pandan Bay beach area, the Library has a separate Main Collection Hall, Reading & Reference Room, Computer Room, Children's Room, a "United Nations Corner", and an external stage area for public presentations. Residents of Pandan can borrow books from the Library for up to three weeks at a time.
 Annual festival – Pandan's popular town fiesta, known as the Tugbong Festival, is held in honor of its patron saint, Saint Vincent Ferrer. The Festival runs from the 21st to the 25th of April and includes, among other events: the Agro-Industrial Fair; the Sports Tournament; the Dalmacio Marathon; the Motocross Invitational Competition; the Dasigay Bugsay Boat Rowing Competition; the Search for Miss Teen Pandan Beauty Pageant; the Ati-Atihan, Mardi-Gras and Float Competitions; and the PBI Annual Alumni Homecoming.
 Pandan Beach Resort - Opened in 2011 by a former Advertising & Promotions Manager of Philippine Air Lines, PBR has become one of the most popular beach resorts in Antique.  Its beachfront location and beautiful facilities attract numerous tourists, both foreign and national,  and include first-class and deluxe accommodations  as well as fan rooms/native cottages for backpackers and other budget travellers.  In-house facilities include spa and health services (body massage, Automated External Defibrillator (AED) and Electrocardiogram machines).  PBR's in-house sister company, Pandan Eco-Adventure Tours (PET), provides transport and tour services covering the entire Panay Island and its component provinces of Aklan, Antique, Capiz, and Iloilo.  PET is also an accredited Philippine Air Lines domestic sales agent, authorized to sell  air tickets on PAL domestic flights.   
 Duyong Golden Beach – A long stretch of white sand beach from where one could see the panorama of the Duyong Mountain Ranges on the east, and a view of Batbatan Island and the setting sun on the west.
 Phaidon Pool and Beach Resort – A white sand beach resort located in Barangay Tingib. This establishment is a joint venture of Filipino and Austrian investors to promote Pandan eco-tourism since 2002. 
 Bunny's Beach Resort – A Filipino-Australian owned resort with a restaurant and bar. located at Barangay Mag-aba along a strip of white sand beach from the banks of the Bugang River to the rocky caves of Pari-Pari.
 Rosepoint Beach – a beach located in Barangay Mag-aba, nestled at the edge where the Bugang river meets the Pandan Bay

Education
Acting under the Department of Education (DepEd), the Pandan School District oversees the implementation of the programs and thrusts of the department. The district is composed of 33 schools—10 mono-grade elementary schools; 5 multi-grade elementary schools, and 18 primary schools—with a total of 200 classrooms.

Secondary education is provided by two private schools (the Pandan Bay Institute, Inc. (PBI) and the Jinalinan Academy) and four public schools (the Pandan National Vocational High School (PNVHS), and the Patria, Mag-aba, and Santa Ana National High Schools). These six schools have a combined 58 classrooms.

Mag-aba National High School was founded in 1977. At first it was a Barangay High School but upon the term of President Corazon Aquino, all Barangay High Schools were renamed as National High Schools. Mag-aba National High School was relocated to the eastern part of the Barangay Mag-aba in 1992.

Founded in 1947, the PBI (Pandan Bay Institute, Inc.) was formerly run by the Diocese of Antique but is now managed and operated by the Canadian Missionary Brothers of Christian Instruction (commonly known as the La Mennais Brothers). The Jinalinan Academy is operated by the Seventh-day Adventists. Located in the town proper, the PNVHS (Pandan National Vocational High School) was founded in 1997 and had its first graduates at the end of the 2000–2001 school year.

On a limited basis, tertiary education is provided by the Jinalinan Academy (which offers a one-year Health Aide course) and by the PBI (which offers two-year Computer Science and Computer Secretarial courses).

Elementary schools

 Agripino Tambagahan Memorial School (Dumrog)
 Badiangan Elementary School
 Bagumbayan Elementary School
 Botbot Elementary School
 Buang Elementary School
 Cabugao Elementary School
 Ciriaco Tayco Memorial School (Dionela)
 Duyong Elementary School
 Fragante Elementary School
 Guia Elementary School
 Idiacacan Elementary School
 Jinalinan Elementary School
 Maadios Elementary School
 Mag-aba Elementary School
 Nauring Elementary School
 Pandan Central School (Centro Norte)
 Patria Elementary School
 San Andres-Dumrog Elementary School
 Santa Ana Elementary School
 Santa Cruz Elementary School
 Santa Fe Elementary School
 Santo Rosario Elementary School
 Tabay Elementary School
 Talisay Elementary School
 Tingib Elementary School
 Vidal Gelito MS (Candari)

Secondary schools

Jinalinan Academy
Mag-aba National High School
Pandan Bay Institute
Pandan National Vocational High School (Centro Norte)
Patria National School
Santa Ana National High School

Tertiary schools

Pandan Bay Institute
University of the Philippines - Visayas (Antique)

Healthcare
Pandan has one district hospital, the Justice Calixto Zaldivar Memorial Hospital formerly known as Gov. Leandro Locsin Fullon General Hospital, with a 25-bed capacity located at Barangay Bagumbayan, one kilometer away from the town center. It is staffed by a chief of hospital, two resident physicians, eight nurses, one midwife, one dentist, one pharmacist, one medical technologist, and one nutritionist. Attached to the hospital is the Alexander Liberman Memorial Surgical Pavilion.

There is a private Lying-In-Clinic (Tugon Medical Clinic) which is located at the town center. It has a 10-bed capacity and is staffed by one physician, five nurses, one midwife, one dentist, two pharmacists and one medical technologist.

The Municipal Health Office is staffed by one Municipal Health Officer (MHO), two Public Health Nurses (PHN), ten Rural Health Midwives (RHM), one Rural Sanitary Inspector (RSI), four casuals, and one janitor. Each RHM has her own catchment area which is composed of 3-4 barangays. One RHM is based at the Main Health Center. Out of nine Barangay Health Stations (BHS), only three  have permanent buildings and these need repair. Midwives with no permanent BHS occupy the Barangay Hall.

The programs and services implemented by the Municipal Health Office are: National Tuberculosis Control Program (NTP); Health and Sanitation; Maternal and Child Health Care (MCHC); Nutrition; Expanded Program on Immunization (EPI); Control of Diarrheal Disease; Leprosy Control, and Family Planning. These programs and services are implemented throughout the municipality through the efforts of the Rural Health Personnel with the help of the Barangay Health Workers (BHW), Barangay Nutrition Scholars (BNS) and trained hilots in their respective barangays.

Infrastructure

Water supply 
Pandan has a sufficient supply of water in general. It also has good sources of potable water that may not require chemical treatment. The water supply operates at three levels—the individual faucet system (Level III); the communal faucet system (Level II) and the point source system (level I) -- which are in the form of wells and springs common in the rural areas.

A Level III Water Works System operated and maintained by the Pandan Water District supplies 20 barangays in the municipality. The system was built through a joint undertaking of the Japan Asian Friendship Society and the Local Government of Pandan. The system basically draws water from a spring located in Malumpati and pumps it to a reservoir located in Santo Rosario. It then distributes water by gravity to its concessionaires. It is currently capable of supplying 540,000 liters per day, mainly for domestic consumption (currently involving 1,132 users).

Other barangays not covered by the Pandan Water District get their water through gravity-type spring development projects, involving the installation of communal faucets at strategic locations within each barangay.

Level I systems exist in areas where other sources are not available. Prior to the operation of the Level III system, Level I systems were popularly used by most of the households in the municipality. At present, these are still maintained as a back-up source of water supply.

Power supply
The Aklan Electric Cooperative (AKELCO) supplies electricity to the municipality. AKELCO sourced its power from the National Power Corporation. Electricity had already reached almost majority of the barangays in the municipality except those, which are located in the hinterlands. One barangay in the hinterland obtains its electricity from a mini-hydro power plant.

In Pandan, the total percentage of household served is 33.31% in the rural area while 86.13% is being served in the urban area. Even though some households can already be reached by electric supply, they choose not to get connected due mainly to its high cost. They rely instead on other means for lighting, cooking and other purposes.

Although the government with the partnership of the AKELCO is currently implementing its electrification program in the barangays, delays in the implementation can be expected because of the high cost of transmission lines and other facilities needed. There is also a low demand in electric connection because some households are not capable of paying installation expenses as well as the monthly bills.

Power outages and fluctuation can be frequently experienced in Pandan which usually occur during weather disturbances.

AKELCO gets its supply of power from NAPOCOR through a 69 kV transmission line traversing the Iloilo-Capiz-Aklan area. When power from this line is cut-off due to maintenance or weather disturbances, Pandan experiences a power outage.

Notable personalities

Loren Legarda - senator, journalist, and UN Global Champion for Resilience
Megan Young - Filipino-American actress, model, TV Host and beauty queen. She won the Miss World Philippines title and was later crowned as Miss World 2013 in Bali, Indonesia. She is the daughter of Victoria Talde who hails from Pandan, Antique.
Lauren Anne Young - Filipino-American actress and model. She is the younger sister of actress and Miss World 2013 Megan Young.
Nelia Sancho - born 1951 in Botbot, Pandan, Antique was Binibining Pilipinas 1969 1st Runner Up and Queen of the Pacific 1971 winner.
Jansen Magpusao - actor who portrayed the lead role in 2019 Cinemalaya film John Denver Trending
Salvacion Zaldivar-Perez - former Antique Governor.
Calixto Zaldivar – former representative, Lone District of Antique (1934–1935), former Governor of Antique (1951–1955) and former Associate Justice of the Supreme Court (1964–1974). Former president of the National Lay Organization of the Iglesia Filipina Independiete.

References

External links

 Pandan on Pandan.ph
 [ Philippine Standard Geographic Code]

Municipalities of Antique (province)
Spa towns in the Philippines
Beaches of the Philippines